S.P. Tre Penne, lit. 'S.P. Three Pen', is a football club based in the City of San Marino. The club was founded in 1956, and currently plays in Girone B of Campionato Sammarinese di Calcio. The team colors were blue and white when home, and red when away. Later on the team color was changed to green.

On 9 July 2013, Tre Penne became the first Sammarinese team to win a game in a European competition by defeating Shirak 1–0 in the second leg of their 2013–14 UEFA Champions League first qualifying round contest.

Honours
Campionato Sammarinese di Calcio: 4
 2011–12, 2012–13, 2015–16, 2018–19
Coppa Titano: 6
 1966–67, 1969–70, 1981–82, 1982–83, 1999–2000, 2016–17
San Marino Federal Trophy: 1
 2005
Super Coppa Sammarinese: 3
 2013, 2016, 2017

History
Two months after the A.C. Libertas on 11 November 1928, the team was established at the behest of the Segretario Sammarinese Fascist Party, Manlio Gozi. By the 1930s, the U.S. Sammarinese Titania was buying purely organizational characteristics; the birth of the first concept of the national associations, and promotion of the formation of Titania 4 Youth Sports Groups. On 21 August 1933, in the capital, La Serenissima was formed and Marina Belluzzi was appointed as chairman. La Serenissima was the team that represented the capital of San Marino in the first edition of the Titan Cup in 1937. The colours were already white and blue following tradition inherited from Tre Penne. The onset was initially a win 2–0 in La Castellana di Serravalle, but the final of the Cup saw them take third place. La Serenissima reformed after the war. In 1952, they started a Titan Cup.

In 1956, at the behest of a group of sportsmen of the Castle, San Marino regained its representative football status in Tre Penne; which took its name from the three peaks of Monte Titano and the colours of the Serenissima (black and white).
Curiously, even Tre Penne became a sort of representative Sammarinese. In 1959, Italy gained recognition by the Regional Committee of Bologna FIGC, and then Tre Penne joined forces with Libertas. Born Libertas Tre Penne, it was chaired by the Director of the Government of Tourism, Gian Vito Marcucci, who kept the colours of the Tre Penne.
Speakers from the ashes of the Federation and Libertas, Tre Penne was moulded into the sports Serenissima, today San Marino Calcio.
The first success for Tre Penne still comes in the form of Representative of San Marino in 1966 when it participated in Bergonzona (Switzerland) Amateurs in the Tournament of small states. To the surprise of trainers, Sammarienese proceeded to the final and almost went unbeaten, but they ultimately lost against Austria.
In 1967 they won their first Titan Cup.
Tre Penne took its first steps by introducing Marco Macina, the first player to wear the jersey of San Marino as an extra-national Italian Under-16 Championship in 1982, to their team. They became the European champions in the categories, but then mill already in the ranks of militant youth of Bologna.

The club registered their first win in European competitions on 9 July 2013, as they beat Shirak by a scoreline of 1–0, thanks in no small part to the efforts of goalkeeper Federico Valentini.

European record

Overview

Matches

Current squad
As of 28 September 2021.

Former players

  Vladimir Mikhaylovskiy
  Maicon

Managers

 Stefano Ceci (2010–12)
 Morris Tamburini (2013–17)
 Luigi Bizzotto (2017–18)
 Stefano Ceci (2018–)

References

External links
 Official website
 FSGC page
 Tre Penne at EUFO.DE
 Soccerway Profile

 
1956 establishments in San Marino
Association football clubs established in 1956
Football clubs in San Marino
Sport in the City of San Marino
Former Italian football clubs